Vicky Psarakis (born June 22, 1988) is an American singer, best known as the vocalist of Canadian metal band The Agonist. She joined the band in 2014, replacing original vocalist and co-founder Alissa White-Gluz. With The Agonist, she has released two EPs, titled Disconnect Me and Days Before The World Wept, as well as three albums titled Eye of Providence, Five and Orphans. In 2021, she launched a new band called Sicksense. She has also worked on other projects like E.V.E and Rage of Romance.

Personal life 
Psarakis moved to Greece at the age of 10.

She has a YouTube channel where she mainly uploads vocal covers. In August 2020, she joined creator platform Patreon. In early 2021, she also started streaming on Twitch.

Psarakis provided spoken word vocals for one track on Epica's 2021 album Omega.

Discography

E.V.E. 
Equations Vanquish Equality (2012)

Rage of Romance 
Rage of Romance (2014)

The Agonist 
Disconnect Me (2014, EP)
Eye of Providence (2015)
Five (2016)
Orphans (2019)
Days Before the World Wept (2021, EP)

Sicksense 
Kings Today (2022, EP)

Filmography

Video Games

References 

1988 births
Living people
American heavy metal singers
American people of Greek descent
American YouTubers
American women heavy metal singers
21st-century American singers
21st-century American women singers
21st-century American women musicians